House of 1000 Corpses is a 2003 American black comedy horror film written, co-scored, and directed by Rob Zombie in his directorial debut, and the first film in the Firefly film series. It stars Sid Haig, Bill Moseley, Sheri Moon, Karen Black, Rainn Wilson, Chris Hardwick, Tom Towles, Erin Daniels, Jennifer Jostyn, Walton Goggins, and Dennis Fimple in his final role. The plot centers on a group of teenagers who are kidnapped and tortured by a psychotic family during Halloween after traveling across the country to write a book.

Inspired by 1970s horror films such as The Texas Chain Saw Massacre (1974) and The Hills Have Eyes (1977), Zombie conceived the film while designing a haunted-house attraction for Universal Studios Hollywood, where filming took place in 2000 on the backlots and Valencia, California. When the studio shelved the film fearing that it would receive an NC-17 rating, Zombie re-acquired the rights. They were eventually sold to Lions Gate Entertainment, who released the film in April 2003. Despite receiving an unfavorable response from critics, it went on to gross $16 million worldwide. Since its release, the film has achieved a cult following, was developed into a haunted-house attraction by Zombie for Universal Studios, and was followed by two sequels, The Devil's Rejects (2005) and 3 from Hell (2019).

Plot
On October 30, 1977, amateur criminals Killer Karl and Richard Wick attempt an armed robbery at a gas station/horror museum, but are killed by the owner, Captain Spaulding, and his assistant, Ravelli. Later that night, Jerry Goldsmith, Bill Hudley, Mary Knowles, and Denise Willis are on the road in hopes of writing a book on offbeat roadside attractions. When the four meet Spaulding, who is also the owner of "The Museum of Monsters & Madmen", they learn of the local legend of Dr. Satan. As they take off in search of the tree from which Dr. Satan was hanged, they pick up a young free-spirited hitchhiker named Baby, who claims to live only a few miles away. Shortly after, a mysterious figure appears hidden in some overgrowth and shoots out their vehicle's tire with a shotgun. The group thinks it is just a blown out tire and so Baby takes Bill to her family's house to get a tow truck. Moments later, Baby's half-brother, Rufus, picks up the stranded passengers and takes them to the family home.

There, they meet Baby's family: her adopted brother Otis Driftwood, her deformed giant half-brother Tiny, Mother Firefly, and Grandpa Hugo. While being treated to dinner, Mother Firefly explains that her ex-husband, Earl, had previously tried to burn Tiny alive, along with the Firefly house after he suffered a psychotic breakdown. After dinner, the family puts on a Halloween show for their guests and Baby offends Mary by flirting with Bill. After Mary threatens Baby, Rufus tells them their car is repaired. As the couples leave, Otis and Tiny, disguised as scarecrows, attack them in the driveway and take them captive. The next day, Otis kills Bill and mutilates his body for art. Mary is tied up in a room and tormented by Otis, Denise is tied to a bed dressed up as a doll for Halloween, and Jerry is partially scalped for failing to guess Baby's favorite movie star.

When Denise doesn't come home, her father Don calls the police to report her missing. Two deputies, George Wydell and Steve Naish, find the couples' abandoned car in a field with a dead, mutilated cheerleader in the trunk (one of five cheerleaders who went missing over a week ago, as explained in a news broadcast; an earlier scene established that the cheerleaders were being tortured, raped and killed by the Firefly family). Don, a former policeman, is called to the scene to help the deputies search. They arrive at the Firefly house and Wydell questions Mother Firefly about the missing teens. Mother Firefly shoots Wydell in the head and kills him; Don and Steve are then killed by Otis when they find more bodies of missing cheerleaders in the barn, along with a barely conscious Mary.

Later that night, the three remaining teenagers are dressed as rabbits and taken out to an abandoned well. Otis torments Denise using the skin of her dead father's face as a mask. Mary attempts to run away, but is tracked down and stabbed to death by Baby moments later. Otis and the family burn the bodies on a pyre.

Meanwhile, Jerry and Denise are placed in a coffin and lowered into a well, where a group of Dr. Satan's failed experiments break open the coffin and pull Jerry away, leaving Denise to find her way through an underground lair. As she wanders through tunnels filled with mutilated corpses, she encounters Dr. Satan and a number of mental patients; Jerry is on Dr. Satan's operating table being vivisected, and dies as Denise screams. Dr. Satan orders his mutated gargantuan assistant, who turns out to be Mother Firefly's ex-husband Earl, to capture Denise, but Denise outwits him and escapes by crawling to the surface as Earl is crushed by falling debris in the collapsing tunnel.

She makes her way to the main road where she encounters Captain Spaulding, who gives her a ride in his car. She passes out from exhaustion in the front seat, and Otis suddenly appears in the back seat with a knife. Denise later wakes up to find herself strapped to an operating table, surrounded by Dr. Satan and Earl, who survived the cave-in. The movie ends with Denise screaming in horror and the words "The End?" displayed before the end credits.

Cast

 Sid Haig as Captain Spaulding
 Bill Moseley as Otis
 Sheri Moon Zombie as Baby
 Karen Black as Mother Firefly
 Chris Hardwick as Jerry Goldsmith
 Erin Daniels as Denise Willis
 Jennifer Jostyn as Mary Knowles
 Rainn Wilson as Bill Hudley
 Walton Goggins as Steve Naish
 Tom Towles as Deputy George Wydell
 Matthew McGrory as Tiny
 Robert Allen Mukes as Rufus
 Dennis Fimple as Grandpa Hugo
 Harrison Young as Don Willis
 William Bassett as Sheriff Frank Huston
 Irwin Keyes as Ravelli
 Michael J. Pollard as Stucky

Chad Bannon and David Reynolds also appear as amateur robbers Killer Karl and Richard Wick. Walter Phelan portrays Dr. Satan. Earl Firefly, referred to in the credits as "The Professor", is portrayed by Jake McKinnon.

Production

Development
Rob Zombie rose to fame as a member of the band White Zombie before beginning a solo career. Zombie's debut album, Hellbilly Deluxe (1998), was influenced by classic horror films, as were its music videos for "Living Dead Girl" (1999) and "Superbeast" (1999). The album was a commercial success, selling over three million copies in the United States. Prior to working on House of 1000 Corpses, Zombie had worked on animation for Beavis and Butt-Head Do America (1996), directed music videos, and unsuccessfully attempted to write a script for The Crow: Salvation. In 1999, Zombie designed a haunted maze attraction at Universal Studios that was instrumental in reviving the studio's annual Halloween Horror Nights and for which Bill Moseley presented Zombie an award. The studio later began working on an animated Frankenstein film which Zombie hoped to be a part of, though plans for the film were ultimately scrapped by the studio.

The idea for House of 1000 Corpses came to Zombie while designing a haunted house attraction with that title for the studio, and Universal responded positively to his pitch. Zombie later stated "I was in the office of the head of production or something and he asked me if I had any movie ideas and I pitched him Corpses, which was very rough at the time, because I wasn't ready and I made it up on the spot. He liked it, I went home, wrote a 12-page treatment and met up with them. Two months later, we were shooting." Production on the film began in May 2000 and was finished by Halloween of 2000. The house was launched the following year, although the title was changed to "American Nightmare" due to the film's shelving. Despite the name change, the house still featured numerous references to the film, and the theatrical trailer played while customers waited.

The film's starting budget was $3–4 million, though its final budget is debatable. Zombie first claimed that the film was made solely with the initial $4 million but later described a budget between $7 million and $14 million. Zombie later admitted that he initially knew he did not have the funding for a good ending but gambled that if he shot what he could on what remained of his budget, the studio would kick in more funds to make a better ending. "I knew the ending sucked, so I let it suck and they said, 'The movie's great but the ending sucks' and I know. So they gave me more money and we shot a more elaborate ending, bigger sets, the whole razzamatazz." The original film featured more characters, including a skunk ape, and featured footage of the four teenagers on their road trip. Universal hoped that the film would focus more on the group of kids, but Zombie knew "nobody gives a shit about the kids". Zombie claimed the film was not initially meant to feature elements of black humor, saying it "turned out a little wackier and campier than I originally intended. But as we were shooting, that's the tone that it was turning out to be. Movies sometimes dictate their own course, so I just sort of went with it."

The film was shot on a 25-day shooting schedule. Two weeks were spent filming on the Universal Studios Hollywood backlots—the house featured in the film is the same house used in The Best Little Whorehouse in Texas (1982), and it can be seen on Universal Studios' tram tours. Zombie stated that filming on the lot was at times difficult, as the amusement park was often open and ruined takes. The remaining 11 days of the shoot were spent on a ranch in Valencia, California. The scene involving Bill being transformed into "Fishboy" was initially much longer, featuring gory details of the creation of the monster. Zombie stated the scene was created after Universal passed on the film. Scenes featuring Baby masturbating with a skeleton, along with other cutaway scenes, were filmed in Zombie's basement after initial filming for the project had concluded. Zombie later cited home recordings from the Manson family as inspiration for the Firefly family's "bizarre" rants. Zombie often filmed two versions of scenes, one of them less gory, in an attempt to please Universal.

Jake McKinnon could not see well when dressed as The Professor, and almost hit actress Erin Daniels with a real ax during the film's climax. Zombie later said he had simply hoped Daniels would move out of the way in time. When Denise calls her father from a telephone booth, a sign for a missing dog head can be seen hanging in the booth; this was in fact a real item found by Zombie and used for the film. In the early stages of the film, Grandpa Hugo was to have been revealed as the murderous Dr. Satan, who at the time was simply referred to as the mad doctor. The legend of the mad doctor was to be a ploy by the Firefly family to lure victims in, though this idea was later scrapped. This led to Grandpa Hugo receiving much less screen time. The character of Dr. Satan was inspired by a 1950s billboard-sized poster advertising a "live spook show starring a magician called Dr. Satan" that Zombie has in his house.

Casting

The film's main cast consisted of the murderous Firefly family, the four teenagers and various police officers attempting to find the group, among others. Sid Haig was cast as Captain Spaulding, a man who dresses as a clown and owns a gas station and museum of curiosities. Haig claimed he had to "get in touch with [his] own insanity" for the role. His relation to the Firefly family is not revealed in the film, though he is working with them to some extent; however, the sequel establishes that he is the father of Baby. Bill Moseley starred as Otis B. Driftwood, who was adopted into the Firefly family. Sheri Moon Zombie portrayed Baby Firefly, who became known for her high pitched laugh and sexual nature. Karen Black was cast as Mother Firefly, the protective mother to the family. Matthew McGrory portrayed Tiny Firefly, a tall man who was left deformed after a house fire started by his father. Robert Allen Mukes portrayed Rufus "RJ" Firefly. Jr. Dennis Fimple was selected to play Grampa Hugo Firefly. He died following filming, and the finished product was dedicated to him.

The names of members of the Firefly family were taken from the names of Groucho Marx characters. Captain Spaulding was a character in Animal Crackers (1930), Otis B. Driftwood was a character in A Night at the Opera (1935), Rufus T. Firefly was taken from Duck Soup (1933), and lastly Hugo Z. Hackenbush derived from A Day at the Races (1937). Despite only allusions to this being made in House of 1000 Corpses, it is more prevalent in the film's sequel, with the names becoming integral to the plot. Zombie acknowledged that viewers were meant to "root for" the Firefly family as opposed to the group of teens, though claims it wasn't intentional: "Yeah, I wanted the audience to cheer 'em. I didn't consciously think of it at the time, because I was trying to make Bill and Jerry likeable. But it's like when you saw Beetlejuice and you could tell all Tim Burton cared about was Beetlejuice."

Erin Daniels portrayed Denise Willis. Chris Hardwick was cast as Jerry Goldsmith, a young man who was seen as "hyper" and "wise-cracking". The character Bill Hudley was portrayed by Rainn Wilson. House of 1000 Corpses served as one of Wilson's first films, though he found mainstream success following the film's release. Mary Knowles, Bill's girlfriend, was played by Jennifer Jostyn. Mary was seen as the most confrontational of the group, often clashing with Baby due to her flirtatious relationship with Bill. Harrison Young was selected to play Don Willis, the father of Denise who later goes looking for her and her group of friends. Tom Towles and Walton Goggins portrayed Lieutenant George Wydell and Deputy Steve Naish, respectively; the pair work with Don to find the missing group.

Irwin Keyes was cast as Ravelli, the assistant to Captain Spaulding who helps run the tourist attraction. Michael J. Pollard portrayed Stucky, a friend of Captain Spaulding and Ravelli's. Chad Bannon and David Reynolds played Killer Karl and Richard "Little Dick" Wick, two men who try to rob Captain Spaulding's shop and are murdered. William H. Basset had a small role in the film as Sheriff Frank Huston. Joe Dobbs III played Gerry Ober, a man who works at the liquor store; he is later given the nickname "Goober" by Baby. Gregg Gibbs appeared as Dr. Wolfenstein during the "murder ride". Zombie made a cameo appearance as Dr. Wolfenstein's assistant. Despite initially planning to appear as Dr. Wolfenstein, Zombie opted to be his assistant instead, believing he would look "normal" in costume. Walter Phelan was cast as Dr. Satan, whose real name was S. Quintin Quale.

Music

The score for the film was composed by Zombie, alongside Canadian producer Scott Humphrey. Much of the production work for the soundtrack to the film was done in Humphrey's studio, The Chop Shop. The film's score featured similar musical themes to Zombie's releases, consisting of heavy metal influences. MTV said the music mixed "snippets of ominous hillbilly dialogue with grim horror movie rock." While making the movie, Zombie joked with his manager that he should do a cover of "Brick House" (1977), originally performed by Commodores. His manager later got both Lionel Richie and rapper Trina to appear on a cover of the song with Zombie, under the title "Brick House 2003". Aside from making audio clips and snippets for the film, Zombie recorded a variety of new songs for the film's soundtrack. The song "House of 1000 Corpses", taken from Zombie's album The Sinister Urge (2001), is also present. The soundtrack, released on March 25, 2003, made an appearance on the Billboard 200 chart in the United States. The soundtrack to the film is isolated on home video releases of the film as a separate audio track. Later in 2019, Rob Zombie announced that the soundtrack would be released on vinyl by the label Waxwork Records. The record included an essay by Zombie and a 12x12" photo booklet of behind the scenes photos.

Release
Prior to agreeing to release the film through Universal, Zombie reportedly told the studio of the film's nature, stating "I was really blatant when I talked to them. I didn't want to get into a situation where they thought I was making something mainstream. And I told them that I wanted to make a drive-in movie, something very gritty and nasty and weird." Production of the film was completed in 2000, and was set for release through Universal. The studio completed a theatrical trailer for the film, which was shown in theaters and prior to the Universal ride created by Zombie. Zombie later received a call for a meeting with Stacey Snider, head of Universal, requesting a meeting. Zombie recalled fearing that the studio would demand a re-shoot, though he later learned that Snider's fears of the film receiving an NC-17 rating had led to the company's refusal to release the film. The film remained shelved for several months, with Zombie eventually purchasing the rights to the film from Universal. Zombie claimed that many urged him to scrap the film following the fallout with Universal, though he continued to search for a new distributor.

Zombie later made a deal with MGM to release the film, with MGM slating an October 2002 release for the film. Despite this, MGM later refused to release the film following a controversial remark from Zombie claiming that the company had no morals for releasing the film. Zombie later announced plans to release the film himself, without the backing of a production company. Despite this, Zombie eventually caught the eye of Lions Gate Entertainment, the final studio to sign on for the project. Lions Gate, attempting to venture into new types of films, hoped releasing a horror film would provide more opportunities. The film was cut and edited in an attempt to achieve an R-rating, with Zombie claiming that most of the cut footage featured Sherri Moon Zombie's character.

The first public screening of the film occurred in Argentina on March 13, 2003. House of 1000 Corpses received its theatrical release on April 11, 2003. The film made its debut in the United Kingdom at Fright Fest, and was the fastest selling event of the night. House of 1000 Corpses grossed $3,460,666 on a limited opening weekend, while boasting $2,522,026 on its official opening. The film opened in second at the box office, behind the comedy film Anger Management (2003). It went on to gross $12,634,962 in the United States alone, with an additional $4,194,583 accumulated worldwide. The film's reported gross is $16,829,545. According to Zombie, Lions Gate Entertainment made back their investment on the film on the first day, and shortly afterwards approached Zombie about a sequel to the film. Having already begun developing ideas for a sequel, Zombie quickly began work on a follow-up.

Critical response

House of 1000 Corpses received a generally negative critical reception upon its release. Frank Scheck of The Hollywood Reporter wrote that the film "lives up to the spirit but not the quality of its inspirations" and is ultimately a "cheesy and ultragory exploitation horror flick" and "strangely devoid of thrills, shocks or horror." Clint Morris of Film Threat slammed the film as "an hour and a half of undecipherable plot" and found the film to be "sickening" overall. James Brundage of Filmcritic.com wrote that the film was simply "hick after hick, cheap scary image after cheap scary image, lots of southern accents and psychotic murders," and was "too highbrow to be a good cheap horror movie, too lowbrow to be satire, and too boring to bear the value of the ticket." Slant Magazine gave the film two out of four stars, stating "If not for the blink-and-miss sideshow attractions and stockpile of memorable quotes, [House of] 1000 Corpses would have been easier to shrug off. This vintage curio is proudly and humorously derivative but that familiar aftertaste is that of wasted opportunities." The New York Times also had a negative review of the film, writing "As much as film buffs might enjoy recognizing references to Motel Hell and other drive-in classics, Mr. Zombie's encyclopedic approach to the genre results in a crowded, frenzied film in which no single idea is developed to a satisfying payoff." The review also criticized the cutaway scenes and home footage used throughout the film, adding "Mr. Zombie is both too much of a stylist, always cutting away to oddball inserts, black-and-white flashbacks, negative images and much else, and too little: he is not in enough control of his means to let a mood grow and fester. And festering is what this kind of film is all about."

JoBlo.com had a more positive view of the film, claiming it "slaps together just the right amount of creepy atmosphere, nervous laughter, cheap scares, fun rides and blood and guts to satisfy any major fan of the macabre." Horror Express gave the film a generally positive review, claiming "He has succeeded for the most part, but really this is only a film Rob Zombie could do. Beyond the harkening back to the old days, there are instances where Zombie's signature style comes through. It's a style he has honed over the years through his videos, animations and music. Grotesque imagery is shown through skewed camera angles as grinning faces watch on. A use of bright fluorescents almost creates a deceptive atmosphere of childlike innocence as the devils perfect their craft on screen." Entertainment Weekly gave it a C+, saying "House of 1000 Corpses "isn’t coherent, exactly, but what dripping-ghoul horror movie is these days? The new rule is, It’s not hip to make sense when you’re raising hell." Maitland McDonagh of TV Guide gave the film two out of four stars, stating " It is ugly—in the distinctively washed out, grainy, slightly burned manner of low-budget '70s films—gory and single-mindedly mean, none of which is a criticism since that's exactly what it wants to be." The project was well received by the LA Times, who wrote "Let's give the devil his due. Zombie, who displays a natural flair for the cinematic, has a real appreciation and knowledge of horror pictures and a Diane Arbus-like affinity for sleazy, bizarre Americana and schlock culture. Throughout his fast-moving movie he inserts vintage clips in a witty, telling manner, and as to be expected, Zombie, with Scott Humphries, has come through with a rip-roaring score for his picture."

The film has a 20% "rotten" rating on film review website Rotten Tomatoes, based on 85 reviews, with a weighted average of 3.43/10. The site's consensus reads: "There's an abundance of gore in this derivative horror movie, but little sense or wit." It has a Metacritic score of 31 based on 15 critics, signifying "generally unfavorable reviews".

Since its initial release, the film has gone on to gain a cult following. In his 2007 review of the Blu-ray release, Christopher Monfette of IGN called the film "fun as hell", writing "House of 1000 Corpses is a messy film—veering this way and that across the genre map with no discernible destination. But viewed less a movie and more as an experience, the film offers a certain degree of inspired insanity and a healthy dose of carnival-like madness". Zombie has acknowledged the film's cult status, stating "Now, a decade later, it's become a pretty loved movie among people. It's great that we have this big celebration. I love seeing Sid Haig and the other actors get such great attention from it. The funny thing is, ten years becomes a long time. I'll meet someone who's eighteen years old, and that's always been a film that they've loved. It's funny that the film's been around that long to be like that for some people." CinemaBlend also wrote of the film's cult status, stating "While his Halloween films were a mess, Zombie did bring something new with his original films House of 1000 Corpses and The Devil's Rejects, developing a cult following for his movies on top of the one he earned for his music. Say what you will about him as a director, but there's no denying that he has a unique vision." Zombie has gone on to dismiss the film following its release, saying "The first film [I directed], which people seems to love, is just a calamitous mess. Well, when it came out it seemed like everyone hated it. Now everyone acts like it's beloved in some way. All I see is flaw, upon flaw, upon flaw... upon flaw." The success of the film led to two sequels, released in 2005 and 2019 respectively, and later a seasonal haunted house attraction at Universal Studios Hollywood.

Home media 
It received a home video release on August 12, 2003. For the main menu of the film, Zombie had Sid Haig perform in character as an added bonus. The Blu-ray edition of the film was released on September 18, 2007. The Blu-ray edition of the film features the added menu content with Haig, as well as the bonus features found on its initial release. The film was released alongside The Devil's Rejects (2005) in a combo-pack on January 4, 2011. Zombie spoke in 2003 of releasing a "super-duper deluxe" edition of the film on DVD, which he hoped would include the footage of the scrapped characters, as well as deleted footage from the film's death scenes; Zombie also claimed the "fishboy" scene was initially much gorier, and he hoped to include added footage for that scene. Years later, Zombie elaborated on the subject, stating:

Awards and nominations

References

External links

 
 
 
 

2000s comedy horror films
2003 horror films
2003 films
American black comedy films
American comedy horror films
American serial killer films
Halloween horror films
Films based on urban legends
Films directed by Rob Zombie
Films set in Texas
Films set in 1977
Films shot in California
Lionsgate films
Films with screenplays by Rob Zombie
2003 directorial debut films
Firefly (film series)
American exploitation films
2000s English-language films
2000s American films